Lord of the Silent (2001) is the 13th in a series of historical mystery novels, written by Elizabeth Peters and featuring fictional sleuth and archaeologist Amelia Peabody.

Plot introduction
In this installment, which takes place during the 1915–1916 season, newlyweds Ramses and Nefret Emerson spend their time living on their family's dahabeeyah on the Nile, while the rest of the group remains at the house near Giza, where their excavations continue. Between the antics of Ramses' former associates in the smuggling trade, the reappearance of the Master Criminal, and yet another unknown adversary with a rich find, little time is permitted for romance...but of course, the younger Emersons make the most of it.

Explanation of the novel's title
The title of the book refers to Amon-Re:
"Amon, King of the Gods, Lord of the Silent / who comes at the voice of the poor ... who gives bread to him who has none ... father of the orphan, husband of the widow ... though the servant offends him, he is merciful." (Composite from various prayers, from the front matter of Lord of the Silent)

See also

List of characters in the Amelia Peabody series

Amelia Peabody
2001 novels
Novels set in Egypt
Fiction set in 1915
Fiction set in 1916
Historical mystery novels
Novels set in the 1910s